The Big Punch is a 1921 American silent Western film directed by John Ford. No copy of the film is known to survive in either a public repository or private collection, so it is currently presumed to be a lost film. In France, the film was known under the title Un homme libre ("A Free Man").

Plot
As summarized in a film publication, Buck (Jones) consents to study for the ministry, and before leaving attempts to convince his worthless brother Jed (Curtis) to sober up and stay home with their mother (Lee) during Buck's absence. On the eve of his leaving Buck is implicated in a murder committed by Jed and his gang. Buck serves two years and upon his release completes his study for the ministry before returning home. People ridicule him and laugh at the "jailbird minister," as they call him. During one of his services, his brother and two pals enter the church to hide from the prison officials who are after them. Buck shields them, and they later come to his aid when Flash McGraw (Siegmann), the owner of a dance hall, has lured Hope Standish, a Salvation Army girl (Bedford), to his room, and Buck has to fight the whole gang. A girl who believes McGraw is "throwing her over" reveals that McGraw "framed" the murder charge on Jed and his pals. This gives the men their freedom and clears Buck, leaving him free to marry the Salvation Army girl.

Cast
 Buck Jones as Buck
 Barbara Bedford as Hope Standish
 Jack Curtis as Jed
 George Siegmann as Flash McGraw
 Jack McDonald as Friend of Jed's
 Al Fremont as Friend of Jed's
 Jennie Lee as Buck's Mother
 Edgar Jones as The Sheriff
 Irene Hunt as Dance Hall Girl

See also
 1937 Fox vault fire
 List of Fox Film films

References

External links

 

1921 films
1921 Western (genre) films
American black-and-white films
Films directed by John Ford
Films with screenplays by Jules Furthman
Fox Film films
Silent American Western (genre) films
1920s American films